Marioara Popescu (later Ciobanu, born 9 November 1962) is a retired Romanian rower. She competed at the 1984, 1988 and 1996 Olympics and won gold medals in 1984 and 1996. At the world championships she won seven medals between 1983 and 2000, including two gold medals in the eights in 1990 and 1999.

References

External links
 

1962 births
Living people
Romanian female rowers
Rowers at the 1984 Summer Olympics
Rowers at the 1988 Summer Olympics
Rowers at the 1996 Summer Olympics
Olympic rowers of Romania
Olympic medalists in rowing
World Rowing Championships medalists for Romania
Medalists at the 1996 Summer Olympics
Medalists at the 1984 Summer Olympics
Olympic gold medalists for Romania